Fluclotizolam is a thienotriazolodiazepine derivative which was first synthesised in 1979, but was never marketed. It has subsequently been sold as a designer drug, first being definitively identified in 2017.

See also
 Brotizolam
 Clotizolam
 Deschloroclotizolam
 Etizolam
 Flualprazolam
 Fluadinazolam
 Flubrotizolam
 Fluetizolam
 Ro09-9212

References

Designer drugs
GABAA receptor positive allosteric modulators
Thienotriazolodiazepines